Tomas Bardauskas (born 22 March 1975) is a Lithuanian athlete. He competed in the men's long jump at the 2000 Summer Olympics.

References

1975 births
Living people
Athletes (track and field) at the 2000 Summer Olympics
Lithuanian male long jumpers
Olympic athletes of Lithuania
Place of birth missing (living people)